Alien Arsenal is a 1999 made-for-television science fiction film directed by David DeCoteau. It is a loose remake of an earlier Charles Band production, Laserblast. It is also known as Teenage Alien Avengers.

Premise

Ralph (Josh Hammond) and Baxter (Danielle Hoover) are two high school nerds who are often tormented by bullies at their school. They find a secret chamber which contains a hoard of hi-tech weapons and armor, their superhero dreams become reality. They use these weapons to get back at the bullies as well as to fulfill some superhero fantasies.

But the alien owners are alerted to the discovery, and return to claim their property in a bid to use it to wipe out humanity. The aliens enlist the help of one of the bullies, Monty (Jerrod Cornish)., to get the alien equipment back.

Monty and Ralph discover that they are both being used by the aliens to download an Armageddon Beam  which will wipe out all human life on earth.

Production

Director David DeCoteau used the pseudonym Julian Breen.

Cast 
 Josh Hammond .... Ralph
 Danielle Hoover ....  Baxter
 Michele Nordin ....  Felicia
 Krisztián Kovács ....  Flash
 Jerrod Cornish ....  Monty
 William Vogt ....  Lance
 Riley Smith ....  Chad
 Dominic Catrambone ....  Phil
 Stephanie Mennella ....  Jill
 Chris Olivero ....  Bill
 Robert Donovan ....  Mr. Lipkis
 Brenda Blondell ....  Mrs. O'Houlihan

Reception

TV Guide gave the movie one star calling in an underachieving mixture of Revenge of the Nerds and Laserblast The also found elements of RoboCop and the Mighty Morphin Power Rangers but found the movie lacking in original ideas.

References

External links
 
 Alien Arsenal review at The Science Fiction, Horror and Fantasy Film Review

1999 films
1990s English-language films
1990s science fiction action films
1990s superhero films
1990s teen films
Action television films
American science fiction action films
American superhero films
Films directed by David DeCoteau
Teen superhero films
1990s American films